Besançon – La Vèze Aerodrome  is an airport located  southeast of Besançon in La Vèze, both communes of the Doubs department in the Franche-Comté region of France.

Facilities

See also

References

External links
  CCI Doubs

Airports in Bourgogne-Franche-Comté
Buildings and structures in Doubs